Hanumantgad is a fort located  24 km from Sawantwadi, Sindhudurg district, of Maharashtra. The fort is situated on  plateau at  the top of the hill.

History
The fort was built by Fond Sawants of Sawantwadi  for protection from Portuguese and Kolhapur rulers. IN 1838 this fort was captured by British Army. Aatmo Chuker and his colleagues tried to capture this fort but, failed due to internal rivalry.

How to reach
The nearest town is Banda which is 13 km from Sawantwadi. The base village of the fort is Fukeri which is 16 km from Banda. There are good hotels at Banda, now tea and snacks are also available in small hotels on the way. The Fukeri village is  well connected by motorable road. The trekking path starts from the hillock north of the Fukeri. The trek route passes through dense forest and the ascent is very steep. It takes about an hour to reach the top of the fort. The night stay on the fort is not possible.

Places to see
The fort walls are in demolished condition. The entrance gate on the southern side is in good condition but lay half buried in soil. There are two  bastions and few rock cut cisterns on the fort.  In the Fukeri village there are two metal cannons with manufactured year 1783 engraved upon them.

See also 

 List of forts in Maharashtra
 List of forts in India
 Marathi People
 List of Maratha dynasties and states
 Maratha Army
 Maratha titles
 Military history of India
 List of people involved in the Maratha Empire

References 

 
Buildings and structures of the Maratha Empire
Forts in Sindhudurg district
16th-century forts in India